The Top 100: NFL's Greatest Players was a ten-part television series that set out to determine the top 100 greatest NFL players of all time. It was presented by the NFL Network in 2010.  The series was based on a list of the top 100 National Football League players of all time, as compiled by a "blue-ribbon" panel assembled by the NFL Network. The members of the panel were current and former NFL coaches, players, executives, and members of the media. Each episode, broadcast each Thursday from September 3 to November 4, 2010, introduced a group of 10 players from the list, with each nominee player presented and advocated for by a separate noteworthy individual in the world of sports and entertainment. It started with the players ranked 100 through 91, and moving up the list each week.

The final episode, premiering on November 4, 2010, introduced the top 10 players of all time according to the panel.  Jerry Rice was chosen as the top player of all time, with Jim Brown as the second choice.

The list

† Only team(s) with major contribution.

See also
NFL Top 100
List of Pro Football Hall of Fame inductees
 National Football League 75th Anniversary All-Time Team
 National Football League 100th Anniversary All-Time Team
 National Football League All-Decade Teams

References

External links
The Top 100 list: NFL's Greatest Players

National Football League records and achievements
National Football League television series
2010 in American football
National Football League lists